A slogan is a memorable motto or phrase.

Slogan may also refer to:

Joseph Slogan (born 1931), Canadian politician
Slogan (film), a 1969 French film
Slogans (film), a 2001 Albanian film
"Slogans" (song), a remixed version of Bob Marley song released in 2005
Slogan (heraldry)
Slogan, a font designed by Aldo Novarese (1957)

See also
Lists of slogans
Tagline